is a Japanese football player who plays for Nankatsu SC. He made his debut on 2 March 2013 in a 1–1 draw against Vegalta Sendai.

Club statistics
Updated to 23 February 2016.

References

External links

Profile at Ventforet Kofu

1990 births
Living people
Ryutsu Keizai University alumni
Association football people from Shiga Prefecture
Japanese footballers
J1 League players
J2 League players
Ventforet Kofu players
Tochigi SC players
Association football forwards
Universiade gold medalists for Japan
Universiade medalists in football
Medalists at the 2011 Summer Universiade